Anju-si is a city in the South P'yŏngan province of North Korea. Its population was 240,117 in 2008. The Ch'ongch'on River passes through Anju.

Climate

Administrative divisions
Anju-si is divided into 20 tong (neighbourhoods) and 22 ri (villages):

Economy
Anju lies near large deposits of anthracite coal, and contains one of the largest coal production facilities in the country.
The deposits contain more than 130 million metric tons of coal. Namhŭng-dong is the location of the Namhŭng Youth Chemical Complex, one of North Korea's most important chemical combines. Anju also contains at least one hotel open for foreigners, used primarily to accommodate for more travelers during peak holiday times.

Transportation
Anju-si is served by several stations on the P'yŏngŭi and Kaech'ŏn lines of the Korean State Railway.

Anju has a trolleybus system with one line to Sinanju Chongnyon station. It formerly had another line to Namhung Youth Chemical Complex that looped around the entire complex which closed around 2000.

See also

 List of cities in North Korea

References

Further reading
Dormels, Rainer. North Korea's Cities: Industrial facilities, internal structures and typification. Jimoondang, 2014.

External links
 City profile of Anju 

Cities in South Pyongan